Kristof Vandewalle (born 5 April 1985) is a Belgian former professional road cyclist, who rode professionally between 2008 and 2015 for the ,  and  teams. While a member of the  squad, he won two successive World Team Time Trial Championships and two consecutive Belgian National Time Trial Championships.

His first victory in the team's colours was a third national time trial championships in May 2014, in Hooglede.

Major results

Source: 

2003
 1st Overall Route de l'Avenir
1st Stages 1 & 2
2007
 5th Overall Tour du Haut-Anjou
 8th Overall Tour de l'Avenir
1st Stage 3
 8th Overall Le Triptyque des Monts et Châteaux
2008
 6th Duo Normand (with Bart Vanheule)
 8th De Vlaamse Pijl 
2010
 1st Grand Prix of Aargau Canton
 4th Tre Valli Varesine
 7th Overall Tour de Wallonie
 7th Grand Prix Pino Cerami
 8th Overall Bayern–Rundfahrt
 10th Druivenkoers Overijse
2012
 1st   Team time trial, UCI Road World Championships
 1st  Time trial, National Road Championships
 1st Stage 2b (TTT) Tour de l'Ain
2013
 1st  Team time trial, UCI Road World Championships
 1st  Time trial, National Road Championships
 1st  Overall Driedaagse van West-Vlaanderen
1st Prologue
 3rd Duo Normand (with Julien Vermote)
 7th Overall Tour of Belgium
2014
 1st  Time trial, National Road Championships
 1st Stage 7 (ITT) Tour de Pologne
 1st Stage 7 (ITT) Tour of Austria
 9th Overall Driedaagse van West-Vlaanderen
2015
 1st Stage 1 (TTT) Tour of Alberta
 3rd Time trial, National Road Championships

References

External links

Kristof Vandewalle Quick-Step profile

1985 births
Living people
Belgian male cyclists
Sportspeople from Kortrijk
Cyclists from West Flanders
UCI Road World Champions (elite men)